Bozkurt District is a district of the Kastamonu Province of Turkey. Its seat is the town of Bozkurt. Its area is 308 km2, and its population is 9,170 (2021).

Composition
There is one municipality in Bozkurt District:
 Bozkurt

There are 32 villages in Bozkurt District:

 Alantepe
 Ambarcılar
 Bayramgazi
 Beldeğirmen
 Çiçekyayla
 Darsu
 Dursun
 Görentaş
 Güngören
 Günvakti
 İbrahimköy
 İlişi
 İnceyazı
 Işığan
 Kayalar
 Kestanesökü
 Keşlik
 Kızılcaelma
 Kirazsökü
 Kocaçam
 Koşmapınar
 Köseali
 Kutluca
 Mamatlar
 Ortasökü
 Sakızcılar
 Sarıçiçek
 Şeyhoğlu
 Tezcan
 Uluköy
 Yaşarlı
 Yaylatepe

References

Districts of Kastamonu Province